Castle Rock is a  tall chalk pillar landmark in Gove County, Kansas, United States.

Description
Castle Rock was a landmark on the Butterfield Overland Despatch route (Overland Trail).  The chalk was deposited in the area by an ancient inland sea. The formation was carved by the weathering of the chalk by wind and water.  It received its name because it is said to look like a castle rising above the prairie.

Weathering of the rock formation is increasing due to visitors climbing on the rocks.  In 2001, following a thunderstorm, the tallest spire fell.

On January 29, 2008, Castle Rock and Monument Rocks 31 miles to the west were jointly named as one of the 8 Wonders of Kansas.

Images

See also

Big Basin Prairie Preserve
Little Jerusalem Badlands State Park
Monument Rocks (Kansas)
Mushroom Rock State Park
Rock City, Kansas

References

Further reading
Kansas : A Cyclopedia of State History, Embracing Events, Institutions, Industries, Counties, Cities, Towns, Prominent Persons, Etc; 3 Volumes; Frank W. Blackmar; Standard Publishing Co; 944 / 955 / 824 pages; 1912. (Volume1 - Download 54MB PDF eBook),(Volume2 - Download 53MB PDF eBook), (Volume3 - Download 33MB PDF eBook)

External links

Castle Rock Badlands 
Castle Rock
Gove County Map, KDOT

Rock formations of Kansas
Landforms of Gove County, Kansas
Tourist attractions in Gove County, Kansas